The following is a list of events relating to television in Ireland from 1960.

Events

 6 April – The Broadcasting Authority Act, establishing the new television service, was enacted.
 June – Architect Michael Scott was commissioned to design new television studios at Montrose, Donnybrook.
 2 June – First meeting of the Radio Éireann Authority (later the RTÉ Authority), a seven-member board established by the Broadcasting Authority Act to make policy and guide corporate direction for radio and television in Ireland.
 August
 The official Telefís Éireann symbol, designed by Richard Butterworth of the broadcaster's design department, was adopted and published. Its design was based on Saint Brigid's cross.
 Introduction of the first combined television and radio licence fee, costing £4. The price of a single radio licence increased to £1.
 November – Edward J. Roth was appointed the first Director-General of RTÉ.

See also
1960 in Ireland

References

 
1960s in Irish television